Sandyford is a small village in Stoke-on-Trent near to Goldenhill and Tunstall. Churchill China has its large factory based in Sandyford.

References

External links

Villages in Staffordshire
Stoke-on-Trent